Lasiosticha antelia is a species of snout moth in the genus Lasiosticha. It was described by Edward Meyrick in 1885. It is found in Australia.

References

Moths described in 1885
Phycitini